The Vixens is a 1947 historical novel by the American writer Frank Yerby. It was his second published novel and like the first, The Foxes of Harrow, to which it was a sequel it was a commercial success and was ranked fifth on the Publishers Weekly list of bestselling novels that year. Yerby himself disliked the book and later described it as his worst novel.

References

Bibliography
 Brown, Stephanie. The Postwar African American Novel: Protest and Discontent, 1945-1950. University Press of Mississippi, 2011.
 Hill, James Lee. Anti-heroic Perspectives: The Life and Works of Frank Yerby. University of Iowa, 1976. 
 Korda, Michael. Making the List: A Cultural History of the American Bestseller, 1900–1999 : as Seen Through the Annual Bestseller Lists of Publishers Weekly. Barnes & Noble Publishing, 2001.

1947 American novels
American historical novels
Novels by Frank Yerby
Dial Press books
Novels set in the 19th century
Sequel novels
Novels set in Louisiana